William "Henry" Hall (August 29, 1922 – May 25, 2016) was an American professional boxer who competed from 1942 to 1960. His birth name was William Hall.

Early life
Born in Napoleonville, Louisiana, Hall was the second of five children of Louis and Ida Hall. After his mother's death, the family moved to New Orleans, where he began boxing at the Rampart Street gym.

Professional career
Hall turned professional in 1942 and adopted "Henry" Hall as his ring name at the suggestion of his manager, who said the name sounded more sporty.

On October 15, 1948 he defeated Archie Moore, the future world light-heavyweight champion, in New Orleans. Hall was ranked as the ninth-best light heavyweight in the world that year in The Ring's annual ratings. He fought in exhibition bouts against Joe Louis and Ezzard Charles in 1950 and 1951, respectively. He also held Heinz Neuhaus to a ten-round draw in Germany in 1955. He retired in 1960.

Later life
Hall moved to Milwaukee in the 1950s. After retirement, he worked as a cement mason and a school bus driver. He suffered from dementia in his later years and died on May 25, 2016 at age 93.

References

External links
 

1922 births
2016 deaths
Boxers from Louisiana
American male boxers
Light-heavyweight boxers
People from Napoleonville, Louisiana
Sportspeople from New Orleans